The Volvo Margarete Rose was a concept car, which was built by Volvo sometime in 1953. It was planned as the complement to the PV 444. Some of the lines were reused on the Amazon, the 160, and the 260.

Margarete Rose